
The Pinacothèque de Paris was an art gallery in Paris, France, with exhibition space for temporary exhibitions of artworks. It was owned and run by Modigliani enthusiast Marc Restellini. It closed in 15 February 2016 after going into receivership in November 2015.

Background
The art gallery opened on 15 June 2007 at 28, Place de la Madeleine in the 8th arrondissement of Paris, France. It was previously at 30, Rue de Paradis in the 10th arrondissement, where an exhibition of works by Picasso was held in Autumn 2003. The gallery is funded from private sources and organizes exhibitions. There is no permanent collection of artworks.

The architect of the building was Lawrence Guinamard-Casati.

Exhibitions 
2003
 Picasso Intime (November 7, 2003 – March 28, 2004)

2007
 Roy Lichtenstein: Evolution (June 15 – September 23)
 Chaïm Soutine: le fou Smilovitchi (October 10, 2007 – January 27, 2008)

2008
 Workshop Man Ray (March 5, 2008 – June 2, 2008)
 Soldiers of Eternity (June 15, 2008 – September 14, 2008)
 Jackson Pollock and Shamanism (October 15, 2008 – February 15, 2009)
 Georges Rouault (September 17, 2008 to January 18, 2009)

2009
 Suzanne Valadon – Maurice Utrillo (March 12, 2009 – September 15, 2009)
 Carte Blanche Hervé di Rosa (June 19, 2009 – September 2009)
 The Dutch Golden Age (October 7, 2009 – February 7, 2010)

2010
 Edvard Munch or the "Anti-Scream" (February 19, 2010 – July 18, 2010)
 The Inca's Gold: Origins and Mysteries(September 10, 2010 – February 6, 2011)

2011 
 Romanovs, Tsars and Art Collectors (January 26 – May 29, 2011)
 Esterházys, Princes and Art Collectors (January 26 – May 29, 2011)
 Hugo Pratt's imaginary Journey (March 17 – August 21, 2011)
 Giacometti and the Etruscans (September 16, 2011 – January 8, 2012)

2012 
 The Mayan Jade Masks (January 26 – June 10, 2012)
 The Netter Collection: Modigliani, Soutine and the Montparnasse Adventure (April 4 – September 9, 2012)
 Van Gogh: Dreams of Japan / Hiroshige, the Art of Travel (October 3, 2012 – March 17, 2013)

2013 
 Art Nouveau: the Decorative Revolution (April 18 – September 8, 2013)
 Tamara de Lempicka: the Queen of Art Deco (April 18 – September 8, 2013)
 Goya and Modernity (October 11, 2013 – March 16, 2014)
 Brueghel's Dynasty (October 11, 2013 – March 16, 2014)
 Chu Teh-Chun, Ways to Abstraction (October 11, 2013 – March 16, 2014)

2014 
 The Myth of Cleopatra (April 10 – September 7, 2014)
 Kâma-Sûtra: Spirituality and Eroticism in Indian Art (October 2, 2014 – January 11, 2015)
 The Art of Love in the Time of Geishas (November 6, 2014 – February 15, 2015)

2015 
 In the Time of Klimt, the Vienna Secession (February 12 – June 21, 2015)
 Pressionism: The Masterpieces of Graffiti on Canvas, from Basquiat to Bando - 1970-1990 (March 12 – October 10, 2015)
 From Rubens to Van Dyck, Flemish masterpieces of the Gerstenmaier Collection (July 10 – October 19, 2015)
 Karl Lagerfeld, A Visual Journey, photographs (October 15, 2015 – February 15, 2016)
 Leonardo da Vinci, Il Genio - The Secrets of the Codex Atlanticus unveiled (October 30, 2015 – January 31, 2016)

Singapore project 

In 2013, the Singapore government announced the opening of Singapore Pinacothèque de Paris, a dependence of the museum that would bring Old Masters and Modern art exhibitions to the city. The new museum was planned to be located in a “pop-up” space, during renovations to its eventual home, the historic Fort Canning building in the arts district. The museum opened in May 2015 and closed in April the next year, citing "weaker than expected visitorship and other business and financial challenges".

See also 
 List of most visited art museums in the world
 Pinacotheca

Sources 
 Pinacothèque de Paris, French Wikipedia.

References

External links 

 Pinacothèque de Paris website 
 Pinacothèque de Paris 
 LUX Magazine: From Paris With Love 

Art galleries established in 2007
Defunct art museums and galleries in Paris
2007 establishments in France
Buildings and structures in the 8th arrondissement of Paris
Art galleries disestablished in 2016
2016 disestablishments in France
Art museums disestablished in 2016